The Pennsylvania lieutenant gubernatorial election of 2014 took place on November 4, 2014, to elect the Lieutenant Governor of Pennsylvania. In Pennsylvania, the winners of the lieutenant gubernatorial primary elections join the ticket of their party's gubernatorial nominee.

Primary elections were held on May 20, 2014. Incumbent Republican Lieutenant Governor Jim Cawley was renominated unopposed and ran for re-election to a second term on a ticket with incumbent Governor Tom Corbett. The Democratic nominee was State Senator Mike Stack, who was businessman Tom Wolf's running mate. Wolf and Stack defeated Corbett and Cawley in the general election.

Republican primary

Candidates

Declared
 Jim Cawley, incumbent Lieutenant Governor

Results

Democratic primary

Candidates

Declared
 Mark Critz, former U.S. Representative 
 Brad Koplinski, Harrisburg City Councilman
 Brandon Neuman, state representative 
 Mark Smith, Bradford County Commissioner
 Mike Stack, state senator

Withdrew
 Jay Paterno, former assistant football coach at Penn State and son of former head coach Joe Paterno
 Brenda Alton, Harrisburg Parks and Recreation Director (Turned in petition one minute past the deadline so did not appear on the ballot)

Declined
 Michael Crossey, President of the Pennsylvania State Education Association
 Margo Davidson, state representative
 Larry Farnese, state senator
 John Galloway, state representative
 John Morganelli, Northampton County District Attorney
 John Wozniak, state senator

Polling

Results

See also
2014 Pennsylvania gubernatorial election

References

External links
 Brenda Alton for Lieutenant Governor
 Jim Cawley for Lieutenant Governor
 Mark Critz for Lieutenant Governor
 Brad Koplinski for Lieutenant Governor
 Jay Paterno for Lieutenant Governor
 Mark Smith for Lieutenant Governor
 Mike Stack for Lieutenant Governor

Lieutenant Gubernatorial
Pennsylvania
2014